The 2023 Major League Baseball All-Star Game will be the 93rd Major League Baseball All-Star Game, held between the American League (AL) and the National League (NL) of Major League Baseball (MLB). The game is scheduled to be played on July 11, 2023 and will be televised nationally by Fox. The game will be hosted by the Seattle Mariners at T-Mobile Park in Seattle, Washington. Philadelphia Phillies manager Rob Thomson will manage the National League team, while Houston Astros manager Dusty Baker will manage the American League team.

Host selection
The Seattle Mariners were awarded the game on September 14, 2021. This will be the third time that the Mariners host an All-Star Game; the previous games were in 1979 at the Kingdome and 2001 at Safeco Field, which was renamed T-Mobile Park prior to the  2019 season.

See also
List of Major League Baseball All-Star Games
Major League Baseball All-Star Game Most Valuable Player Award
All-Star Futures Game
Home Run Derby

References

External links

Major League Baseball All-Star Game
Baseball competitions in Seattle
Major League Baseball All-Star Game
2023 in Seattle
2023 in sports in Washington (state)
Major League Baseball All-Star Game
All-Star